Surat is a city and former princely state in Gujarat, India.

Surat may also refer to:

Places 
 Surat (Lok Sabha constituency), the city's parliamentary constituency
 Shortened for Thailand’s Surat Thani Province and Surat Thani City
 Surat district, a local government unit in India
 Surat, Iran, a village in Iran
 Surat, Puy-de-Dôme, a commune in France
 Surat, Queensland, a town in Australia
 Georges Seurat, a French post-Impressionist artist

Other uses 
 Surat (ship)
 Surti (disambiguation)
 Koy Sanjaq Surat, a modern Syriac language
 Surat cotton, a short staple cotton on the genus Gossypium arboreum
 Surah, a division of the Quran
 Surat Sukha, a Thai footballer